The 1974 Wyoming Cowboys football team was an American football team that represented the University of Wyoming as a member of the Western Athletic Conference (WAC) during the 1974 NCAA Division I football season. In their fourth year under head coach Fritz Shurmur, the Cowboys compiled a 2–9 record (1–6 against conference opponents), finished last out of eight teams in the WAC, and were outscored by a total of 283 to 150. They played their home games at War Memorial Stadium in Laramie, Wyoming.

Schedule

References

Wyoming
Wyoming Cowboys football seasons
Wyoming Cowboys football